Saint Charles Preparatory School is a four-year Catholic college preparatory school (a type of high school) in Columbus, Ohio, US. It was founded in 1923 by the fourth bishop of Columbus, James J. Hartley, as a Roman Catholic college seminary and high school. Today, it is an all-male high school serving the Roman Catholic Diocese of Columbus.

The school's patron is Saint Charles Borromeo, and its motto, inscribed above the front door, is Euntes Ergo Docete Omnes Gentes, a quote from the Gospel of Matthew (28:19) in the Latin Vulgate: "Going out, therefore, teach all nations." The original nickname of Saint Charles students is "Carolians", derived from the Latin word "Carolus," which means "Charles." In 1947, the students also began to refer to themselves as "Cardinals."  The Saint Charles sports mascot is Charlie the Cardinal.

Campuses and founding
The school consists of two campuses. The oldest campus is Main Campus, which contains the school, gymnasium, natatorium, and theater. The newest campus is West Campus, which contains the athletic facility, track, and the robotics and mentoring center.
The school was founded in 1923 by Bishop James J. Hartley.  The first classes were held at Sacred Heart School, an all-girls Catholic school, while the main school building was being built.

Main Campus

In 1925, construction of the main school building was completed and classes were held there. In 1931, the gymnasium and the Our Lady Lourdes Grotto were completed. Major renovations were made to the gym in 1951 to more than double the capacity. A Gaelic-style chapel (called the "Lower Chapel") was added on to the east side of the school in 1937. Bishop Hartley dedicated the chapel to Mother of Mercy. A Milwaukee art company beautified the chapel with artwork in 1952. A natatorium was built next to the multipurpose room in 1990. In 1999, the Jack Ryan Training and Fitness Facility was built adjoining to the gym.

Construction on the US$5.5 million Robert C. Walter Student Commons and the Student Services and Fine Arts Center, the largest addition to Saint Charles in its history, began in June 2005.  The approximately  addition, which replaced the courtyard behind the school, was ready for graduation at the end of the following school year; however, it was not available for full use until the 2006–2007 school year. The addition houses the  Robert C. Walter Student Commons Area, which serves as a new cafeteria and provides ample seating space for school and community functions. The Walter Student Commons is named in memory of Robert C. Walter, father of 1963 graduate Robert D. "Bob" Walter, honorary chairman and lead contributor to the current capital campaign being conducted to finance the new addition. Bob Walter and his '63 classmate, architect Robert Corna of Cleveland, initiated the concept for the Commons nearly two years ago.  Corna was the architect on the project, and based his designs off of a similar plan for Saint Ignatius High School in Cleveland, also an all-male school. On the columns supporting the roof are glass panes, which bear the names of all of the alumni of the school, written with laser. Behind the Robert C. Walter Student Commons Area is the  Student Services & Fine Arts Center. The ground floor anchors the north end of the atrium, and houses a new kitchen, sponsored by Donatos Pizza, and restrooms.  The second floor houses offices for the guidance and counseling programs, campus ministry, and the school nurse. On the third floor is an extensive art room and gallery, with a kiln and mud rooms; and a music and choir room, with instrument storage and practice rooms; as well as offices for the respective instructors.  The second and third floor connect to the original building at its rear stairwell, and to the Robert C. Walter Student Commons Area by a staircase.

On November 1, 2018, Saint Charles announced the beginning of funding to its latest addition to main campus. The addition, once funded $20 million, will take the place of the current gymnasium and multi-purpose room and add additional classrooms, laboratories, and a new gymnasium. It is also planned that a hallway will connect the new addition to the main building. This new expansion will be on the current baseball field, and it is expected that Saint Charles will purchase a portion of a nearby park for use to build a new baseball diamond. On November 4, 2021, the school broke ground for its 11.5 million dollar Convocation Center named after its alumni Frank E. Murphy (who graduated in 1954).

West Campus

For the first time in its 89-year history, the school expanded its current Broad Street campus footprint. The centerpiece of this project is the newly purchased property which formerly housed the Dealers Lumber Company and came up for sale in the summer of 2010. St. Charles moved quickly to acquire the 6.2-acre site and closed on the purchase in December. The Robert D. Walter West Campus includes the Savko Athletic Complex, comprising a six-lane running track, the artificial-turf Dominic and Kathleen Cavello Field and parking; a 13,000-square-foot training and fitness facility (weight room and 30 yard turf field for speed and agility); and the Horvath Parking Lot. A pedestrian bridge that spans Alum Creek helps connect it with the main campus at 2010 E. Broad St. The full project, paid for through fundraisers, private donations and in-kind gifts, cost about $5.1 million.

In 2018, Saint Charles unveiled the new Robotics and Mentoring Center (even further west from Main Campus than West Campus, thus gaining the colloquial "West West Campus" or "West-er Campus"). The new center costs $2 million and is 14,000-square-feet. Along with being able to support the Robotics Team and My Brother's Keeper (MBK) mentoring programs, the new building has a recreational area for indoor sports, including an indoor basketball court and a state-of-the-art golf simulator. The new Mentoring Center is connected to West Campus via a sidewalk along Long Street.

Academics
St. Charles graduation requirements include: 4 years of religion class, English, foreign language, mathematics, and science; 3 years of social studies; and 1 year of fine arts, health, physical education. Some of the AP classes that are offered to juniors and seniors are AP Latin, Biology, Physics, Chemistry, English, Calculus, US and World History. For the 2019–2020 year, Saint Charles will add Computer Science Principles and Government.

Saint Charles requires students to take one year of Latin, a practice retained from the school's past, when four years of Latin were mandatory.

In 2005, the State of Ohio implemented the new Ohio Graduation Test (OGT) and Saint Charles Preparatory was one of three schools in Central Ohio to have every sophomore pass every section. (The statewide public school pass rate was 64%.) St. Charles kept this 100% passage rate until its cancellation in 2015.

Saint Charles has a history of a large number of students in the National Merit Scholarship Program. Since the Class of 1993, Saint Charles has had over 3000 graduates , with over 10% (335) becoming Commended Scholars, 215 of which became National Merit Semifinalists.

For the 2020-2021 school year, St. Charles decided to have all in-person classes since they had the ability to spread students out throughout their campus to meet 6 feet social distancing guidelines during the COVID-19 pandemic. In 2020, St. Charles was approved for PPP loans ranging from $350,000 - $1,000,000.

Theatre
Since St. Charles is an all-male school, the theatre department has had to use different methods to incorporate the female roles of plays and musicals. Both prep school and seminary students performed the first plays at St. Charles in 1929 under the direction of Monsignor Joseph A. Cousins. Female roles were played by male students dressing up as women until 1971. It was then that Mrs. Teresa McLean (the school's biology teacher) became the first woman to perform in a St. Charles play. The next year, female students from St. Joseph Academy and Bishop Watterson High School played female parts in a production. Ever since then, female roles for plays have been filled by open auditions from women at other Central Ohio schools. The current theater director is Mr. R. Douglas Montgomery.

Notable alumni
Robert D. Walter: Founder of Cardinal Health, a Fortune 500 health care services company
Bob Duffy (basketball, born 1922): Basketball player
Robert Nugent Lynch: Bishop of St. Petersburg, Florida from 1996 to 2016
Matt Lampson: MLS Goalkeeper for the Columbus Crew SC
Aaron Diehl: Jazz pianist
Nick Muszynski: NCAA basketball player for Belmont Bruins

List of principals and rectors

Athletics
Saint Charles is a member of the Ohio High School Athletic Association and Ohio Water Polo. The list as follows:

Ohio State Championships
 Golf (Div I, 2)- 2009, 2010
 Soccer (A-AA, 2)- 1983, 1985
 Swimming (Div I, 1)- 2008
 Volleyball (non-OHSAA, 2)- 2009, 2018
 Water Polo (non-OHSAA, 7)- 2010, 2011, 2013, 2014, 2018, 2019, Spring 2021
The usual Fall 2020 water polo season was postponed to the spring of 2021 due to the Coronavirus pandemic; as such, the 2018, 2019, and Spring 2021 State Championships constitute a three-peat.

Borromean Lecture Series
The Borromean Lecture Series is an annual occurrence at Saint Charles, usually during the autumn semester, and is sponsored by Robert Dilenschneider, CEO of The Dilenschneider Group. It is named after the Borromeo family of which Saint Charles was a part of. The speakers are the elite in their field and are listed below:

See also
List of high schools in Ohio

References

Fabro, Louis V. Saint Charles Borromeo Preparatory School: The First 75 Years of Excellence. United States: n.p., 2000.

"$5.5 Million Campus Construction Project Underway for the Robert C. Walter Student Commons and the Student Services and Fine Arts Center."  Saint Charles Preparatory School, 2006. http://www.stcharlesprep.org/expansion/index.php

External links
St. Charles Prep Official Website
Diocese of Columbus Education Website
St. Charles Prep Swimming and Water Polo
St. Charles Soccer

Roman Catholic Diocese of Columbus
Educational institutions established in 1923
High schools in Franklin County, Ohio
Catholic secondary schools in Ohio
Boys' schools in Ohio
1923 establishments in Ohio
Charles Borromeo

(German)